Fernando Galván Reula OBE, FEA (born in Las Palmas de Gran Canaria, Spain, 24 July 1957), is a literary scholar and former rector / president of the University of Alcalá (2010–2018), Madrid.

Biography 
He holds a BA (1979) and a PhD (1981) in English from the University of La Laguna, Tenerife, a university where he was appointed Professor of English Language and Literature in 1990. He moved to the University of Alcalá in 1994, where he was appointed as Professor of English Literature, and later as rector / president between 2010 and 2018.

His expertise is in medieval English literature, but he has also edited and translated into Spanish numerous classical literary works from other periods of English literature, and has published widely on modern and contemporary narrative in English. He is member of the editorial boards of more than twenty international scholarly journals in English studies, and has supervised 24 PhD dissertations in that field in the period 1988–2012.

He was visiting scholar in the Department of Comparative Literature of Harvard University in 1993 and 1994. He was appointed in 1994 member of the International Association of University Professors of English (IAUPE), and in 2003 corresponding fellow (FEA) of The English Association, in the UK. During the academic year 2009–2010 he was associate member of the Faculty of English at the University of Oxford, and in October 2009 was appointed visiting fellow of Corpus Christi College, Oxford.

He has held numerous relevant academic positions in Spain and internationally: as member of the boards of the European Association for American Studies (EAAS, 1993–1999), and of the Spanish Society for General and Comparative Literature (SELGYC, 1995–2006); president of the Spanish Association of Anglo-American Studies (AEDEAN, 1996–2002), and president of the European Society for the Study of English (ESSE, 2007–2013). He is now secretary general elect of the International Association of University Presidents (IAUP) for the period 2020–2023.

Works 
He has edited and translated into Spanish many classical authors of English literature from the modern and contemporary periods, such as Philip Sidney, John Milton, Daniel Defoe, Samuel Richardson, Henry Fielding, William Wordsworth, Charles Dickens, Oscar Wilde, James Joyce, Joseph Conrad, George Orwell or Graham Greene. He has also published comparative literary and cultural studies of English and Spanish-speaking countries. In addition to his books on medieval English literature he has published on English novelists of the 19th and 20th centuries. He has edited critical essays on Mary Wollstonecraft, English metafiction, magical realism, or culture and power. He is the author of more than a hundred scholarly articles and book chapters on English-speaking contemporary poets and writers.

Distinctions 
He has been awarded honorary PhD degrees by the
 University of Glasgow (DLitt, 2012),
 National Autonomous University of Nicaragua in León (2012), 
 National University of Villarrica del Espíritu Santo in Paraguay (2014), 
 San Sebastián University in Chile (2016),
 National University of Political Studies and Public Administration in Bucharest, Romania (2017).

He has also been distinguished as
 "Academic Order Simón Bolívar" by the Universidad Simón Bolívar, Colombia (2010),
 "Honorary Diploma" by the Federal University of the South in Rostov, Russia (2011),
 "Honorary Member" by the Universidad de La Serena, Chile (2012),
 Commander of the "Order of Bernardo O’Higgins", by the president of the Republic of Chile,
 "Honorary Fellow" of the National Academy of History and Geography of the National Autonomous University of Mexico (UNAM) (2016),
 "Honorary Officer” of the Order of the British Empire, OBE, by Queen Elizabeth II (2018).

References

External links 
 University of Alcalá

1957 births
Spanish philologists
Academic staff of the University of Alcalá
Officers of the Order of the British Empire
Living people
Fellows of the English Association